The Border Security Force (BSF) is India's border guarding organisation on its borders with Pakistan and Bangladesh. It is one of the seven Central Armed Police Forces (CAPF) of India, and was raised in the wake of the 1965 war on December 1 1965, "for ensuring the security of the borders of India and for matters connected there with".

It has various active roles during an outbreak of war. It is the only CAPF to have a Water Wing, Air Wing and an Artillery Regiment. It comes under the Ministry of Home Affairs. The BSF has its own small force of officers or "Cadre". However, its head, designated as a Director-General (DG), has been an Indian Police Service officer since its establishment. The BSF has grown exponentially from 25 battalions in 1965, to 192 battalions with a sanctioned strength of 270,363 personnel including an expanding air wing, Marine wing, an artillery regiment, and specialized units. It currently stands as the world's largest and most powerful border guarding force. BSF has been termed the First Line of Defence of Indian territories.

History 
Since independence, the protection of India's international boundaries was the responsibility of the local police belonging to each border state, with little inter-state coordination. However, during the Indo-Pakistani War of 1965, Pakistan attacked Sardar Post, Chhar Bet, and Beria Bet on 9 April 1965 in Kutch. This  attack exposed the inadequacy of the State Armed Police to cope with armed aggression. Thus, after the end of the war, the government created the Border Security Force as a unified central agency with the specific mandate of guarding India's international borders. This act  brought greater cohesion in border security. K F Rustamji, from the Indian Police Service, was the first Director General of the BSF. Since it was a new force, the officers had to be deputed or inducted from outside to fill the various vacancies at various levels until the force's own cadre matured sufficiently. It was for this reason that emergency commissioned officers and SS officers of the Indian Army were inducted in large numbers into the force along with IPS officers who were deputed to the force for high level appointments.

The BSF's capabilities were used in the Indo-Pakistani War of 1971 against Pakistani forces in areas where the Regular Forces were thinly spread; BSF troops took part in several operations including the famous Battle of Longewala. In fact, for BSF the war on the eastern front had started well before the war actually broke out in December 1971. BSF had trained, supported and formed part of Mukti Bahini and had entered erstwhile East Pakistan before the actual hostilities broke out. BSF had played a very important role in Liberation of Bangladesh which Indira Gandhi and Sheikh Mujibur Rehman had also acknowledged.

Engagements 
Indo-Pakistani War of 1971
Operation Blue Star
Operation Black Thunder
Insurgency in Punjab 
Insurgency in Jammu and Kashmir
Operation Vijay – Kargil War
2001 Bangladeshi-Indian border skirmishes
2001–2002 Operation Prakarm – India-Pakistan Standoff
2013 India-Pakistan Border skirmishes
2014–15 India–Pakistan border skirmishes
2016–2018 India–Pakistan border skirmishes
2019 India–Pakistan border skirmishes

Objectives 
During peacetime
 Border guard and security.
 Prevention trans-border crimes, unauthorized entry into or exit from the territory of India.
 Prevention of smuggling and any other illegal activities on the border.
 Anti-infiltration duties.
 Collection trans-border intelligence.
 To promote a sense of security among the people living in the border areas.

During war time
 Holding ground in assigned sectors.
 Limited aggressive action against irregular forces of the enemy. 
 Maintenance of law and order in enemy territory administered under the Army's control.
 Acting as guides to the Army in border areas.
 Assistance in control of refugees.
 Provision of escorts.
 Performing special tasks connected with intelligence including  cross-border raids.
 Replenishing manpower.

BSF is also employed for Internal Security Duties and other law and order duties on the requisition of the State Government. Being a Central Armed Police Force it can be entrusted with policing duties at any place apart from its mandate.

Organisation 

The Border Security Force has its headquarters in New Delhi and is known as Force Headquarters (FHQ) headed by a Director General. Various directorates like Operations, Communications & IT, Training, Engineering, General, Law, Provisioning, Administration, Personnel, Armaments, Medical, Finance etc. function under the DG. Each directorate is headed by an IG. The Eastern Theatre is looked after by Spl DG HQ (Eastern Command) at Kolkata and the Western Theatre is looked after by Spl DG HQ (Western Command) at Chandigarh. Field Formations in BSF are headed by an IG and are known as Frontiers Headquarters (FtrHQ). There is 13 such Frontier under which Sector Headquarters (SHQ) function headed by a DIG each. Each SHQ has under its command 4–5 infantry battalions, along with attachments of artillery, air and water wings. Presently 186 battalions are sanctioned to BSF. Five major training institutions and ten Subsidiary Training Centres (STCs) are imparting ab-initio as well as in-service training to its ranks and other CPOs/SPOs including IPS Probationers.

BSF is the only Central Armed Police force to have its own Air Wing and artillery regiment, and besides ITBP to have a Water Wing. All these specialized wings support the General Duty Battalions in their operations. The Financial Adviser of the BSF has been an Indian Revenue Service officer of the rank of Joint Secretary and also has Dy Advisers from the Indian Audit and Accounts Service, Indian Civil Account Service and Indian Defence Account Service.

The BSF also has a national level school for the breeding and training of dogs. Dogs from other CPOs and State Police are sent to National Training Centre for Dogs (NTCD) to be trained in infantry patrol, detection of explosives, tracking and the like.

The BSF maintains a Tear Smoke Unit (TSU), which is unique in India. The TSU is responsible for producing tear gas munitions required for the Anti-Riot Forces. It also exports a substantial quantity to other countries.

Three battalions of the BSF, located at Kolkata, Guwahati, and Patna, are designated as the National Disaster Response Force (NDRF). Each battalion maintains 18 self-contained specialist search and rescue teams of 45 personnel each, including engineers, technicians, electricians, dog squads and medics and paramedics. The establishment of each battalion is 1,158 personnel. The NDRF is a multi-disciplinary, multi-skilled, high-tech force for all types of disasters and can deploy to disasters by air, sea, and land. These battalions are equipped and trained for all natural disasters including combating Chemical, Biological Radiological, and Nuclear (CBRN) disasters.

Since 2014, As a part of modernisation, BSF also started installing infra-red, thermal imagers, aerostats for aerial surveillance, ground sensors, radars, sonar systems to secure riverine borders, fibre-optic sensor and laser beam intrusion detection systems on specific sections  of  border with Pakistan as well as Bangladesh. These Hi-tech systems are installed in areas where barbed wire fencing could not be installed due to treacherous terrain or marshy riverine topography. The largest section of this system is located at Dhubri, Assam, where Brahmaputra river enters Bangladesh.

ORBAT 
Western Command, Chandigarh	
Gujarat Frontier, Gandhinagar
Barmer Sector
Gandhinagar Sector
Bhuj Sector,
Rajasthan Frontier, Jodhpur
Jaisalmer I Sector
Jaisalmer II Sector
Bikaner Sector
Ganganagar Sector
Punjab Frontier, Jalandhar
Ferozepur Sector
Amritsar Sector
Gurdaspur Sector
Jammu Frontier, Jammu
Jammu Sector
Sunderbani Sector
Rajauri Sector
I/Nagar Sector
Kashmir Frontier, Humhama
Srinagar Sector
Baramulla Sector
Bandipore Sector
Kupwara Sector
Eastern Command, Kolkata	
South Bengal Frontier, Kolkata
North Bengal Frontier, Kadamtala
Meghalaya Frontier
SHQ Mawpat, Shillong
FHQ Umpling, Shillong
Tripura Frontier, Agartala
Mizoram & Cachar Frontier, Masimpur
Aizawl Sector
Cachar Sector
CI Ops Manipur
Assam Frontier, Guwahati
ANO(Anti-Naxal Operation) Frontier, Bangalore

Special Detachments

Creek Crocodile
The Creek Crocodile is  the specialized commando unit of BSF. Primary objective of this unit is to act as Quick reaction force and  prevent smuggling and infiltration by unwanted elements. The unit is specifically deployed at Indus River Estuaries in Gujarat and Sir Creek. It was raised in 2009. The base of operations of this unit is located at Koteshwar outpost of BSF. They are equipped with ATVs and fast patrol boats.

Camel Contingent

BSF Camel Contingent is a specialized battalion-size Camelry Unit which has its roots in Bikaner Camel Corps. The primary purpose of this unit is to patrol the  desert section of the border with Pakistan. This unit has a strength of 1200 camels and 800 riders. Both camels as well as riders are trained at Camel Training Centre located at  BSF Frontier Headquarters in Jodhpur. 

However, with force modernization pacing up, BSF has equipped its formation across the western border with All-Terrain Vehicles and other specialized apparatus.

List of DGs of BSF 
K.F. Rustamji, IPS was appointed as the first Director General of Border Security Force from 22 July 1965 to 30 September 1972 and the current Director General is Sujoy Lal Thaosen, IPS, since 1 January 2023.

Counter-Insurgency Operations 

Although, originally charged with guarding India's external boundaries, the BSF in the 1990s was also given the task in counter-insurgency and counter-terrorism operations in Jammu andnd Kashmir, Punjab, and the Northeastern Seven Sister States. While in Punjab, BSF took part in operations like Blue Star, Black Thunder 1 & 2. However, when the insurgency in Jammu and Kashmir broke out in 1989, it moved towards the state and handed over the operations in Punjab to CRPF and local police. In Jammu and Kashmir, state police and the thinly-deployed Central Reserve Police Force (CRPF) struggled to cope with the spiraling violence, so it was deployed to combat these.

In Jammu and Kashmir, BSF initially suffered casualties from terrorist attacks but later saw successes. During the initial years, terrorist activity had even reached Jammu and  parts of Northern Punjab and Himachal Pradesh. However, it was only due successful operations by  BSF that by the late 1990s, their area of activity had restricted only to the valley. 
BSF was also successful in setting up a robust HUMINT network. BSF is also credited for killing Ghazi Baba - chief of Jaish-e-Mohammed and the mastermind of the 2001 Indian Parliament attack in August 2003, along with his deputy commander. The BSF had raided Baba's hideout in Srinagar and he was killed in the ensuing gun battle along with his deputy chief.

However, with changing tactical and operational conditions, and expansion and modernization of State police, the Government withdrew all 16 BSF battalions and redeployed them on the Indo-Pakistani border and Bangladesh–India border. These troops were then replaced by fresh troops from the CRPF that had undergone specialised training in counter-terrorism.

Some units of BSF are also deployed in Central India to combat Naxal violence. Counter-Maoist operations are diversified between. BSF is deployed in Kanker district of Chhattisgarh, where Naxal strength is comparatively thinner than that of other parts of Bastar region. At present total 15 battalions of BSF are stationed in different parts of Kanker district to combat the Naxal menace.

After recent civilian killings in Kashmir the Home Ministry reinducted BSF for counter-insurgency operations and law-and-order duties in valley. The BSF units will be deployed in sensitive areas which lie in various districts of the Kashmir valley.However, A great work done By Commandant Jagmohan Singh Rawat SM,KC  in the Kashmir valley.He has significantly played a crucial role in such kind of operations.

Proposal regarding guarding the Indo-Myanmar border 
The Cabinet Committee on Security (CCS) has been considering a proposal to entrust the border-guarding duty along the Indo-Myanmar border to the Border Security Force (BSF). Presently, the  Indo-Myanmar border is being guarded by Assam Rifles.

The proposed move to guard the Indo-Myanmar border follows a proposal from the BSF to take over the role by raising 45 new battalions, one headquarters of additional director general, four frontier headquarters to be headed by an IG rank official and 12 sector headquarters to be headed by DIG level officials. However, as of 1 March 2015, it was decided by the Ministry of Home Affairs to keep the authority of this border with Assam Rifles only.

Proposed ORBAT for Myanmar Border
Northeast Command HQ, Imphal	
Mizoram Frontier
Manipur Frontier
Nagaland Frontier
Arunachal frontier

Rank structure 
Officers

Enlisted ranks

Awards 

The BSF personnel have been recipients of the following awards:

Military awards 
 Mahavir Chakra
 Kirti Chakra
 Vir Chakra
 Ati Vishisht Seva Medal
 Shaurya Chakra
 Sena Medal
 Vishisht Seva Medal
 Mentioned in Despatches

Civil awards 
 Padma Bhushan
 Padmashri
 Prime Minister's Medal for life saving
 Arjuna Awards

Police medals 
 President's Police Medal for Gallantry
 Police Medal for Gallantry
 President's Police Medal for Distinguished Service
 Police Medal for Meritorious Service

Arjuna awardees 
 Comdt (Retd) Nripjit Singh, Volleyball-1962
 Dy Comdt (Retd) Udham Singh, Hockey-1965
 Dy Comdt (Retd) Praveen Kumar, Athletic-1967
 Inspr (Retd) Jagjit Singh, Hockey-1967
 Asst Comdt (Retd) Ajit Pal Singh, Hockey-1970
 Dy Comdt (Retd) Balwant Singh, Volleyball-1972
 Sec-in-Command Anil Kumar, B/Ball-1974
 Dy Inspr Gen (Retd) Mohinder Singh, Shooting-1983
 Asst Comdt Mahabir Singh, Wrestling-1985
 Asst Comdt Subhash Verma, Wrestling-1987
 Inspr Rajesh Kumar, Wrestling-1990
 Inspr Sanjay Kumar, Wrestling-1998

Equipment 
All the equipment including the uniforms, weapons, ammunition, vehicles such as the bullet proof vehicles, troop carriers, logistics vehicles, mine protected vehicles are manufactured indigenously at the Indian Ordnance Factories under control of the Ordnance Factories Board. Drone and anti-drone equipment is an upcoming acquisition.

Pistols and handguns 
 Glock 9mm Pistols
 Pistol Auto 9 mm 1A 9mm Pistol

Sub-machine guns and carbines 

 Beretta MX4 Storm submachine guns. 68000 SMGs procured and replaced the SAF Carbine 1A.

Assault rifles 
 AKM: 7.62x39mm assault rifle.
 INSAS: 5.56 mm × 45 mm Assault Rifle. Service rifle of the force.
 Tavor: X95 or the MTAR-21 version used as the standard issue carbine 
 Trichy 7.62x39mm Assault Rifle

Machine guns 
 INSAS LMG
 FN MAG MMG
 NSV HMG Tripod Mounted 
 Bren Gun Gun Machine 7.62x51mm OFB Made

Sniper rifles 
 Vidhwansak anti-materiel rifle (AMR) or large-calibre sniper rifle
 Steyr SSG 69
 FN FAL Completely phased out as the service rifle by the INSAS rifle but still used as a DMR.
 Barret M82 12.7 Sniper Rifle

Multi-role recoilless rifle 

 Carl Gustav 84 mm recoilless rifles

Grenade launchers
 AGS-30 Automatic Grenade Launcher
 Milkor MGL Multi Grenade Launcher
 40mm UBGL Under Barrel Grenade Launcher

Artillery 

 51 mm Mortar
 81 mm Mortar 
 120 mm Mortar
 Advance Air defence Avni Gun 
 105 mm Indian Field Gun

Armoured 
 Mahindra Rakshak military light utility vehicle 
 OFD Mine Protected Vehicle
 Tata 407 Bullet Proof Vehicle
 Maruti Gypsy Armoured Variant

Aircraft 

 Embraer 135 BJ - 01
 Mi-17 V5 Helicopter - 08
 Mi-17 1V Helicopter  - 06
 ALH/Dhruv Helicopter - 06
 HAL Cheetah - 01

MANPADS 
 SA-16 Gimlet
 SA-7 Grail

Watercraft 

 Floating Border Out-Post - 03
 See BSF (Water Wing)

Criticism and controversy

Canadian controversy 
In 2010, some Canadian visa officials rejected the immigration application of a retired BSF soldier Fateh Singh Pandher, terming BSF a "notoriously violent paramilitary unit engaged in systematic attacks on civilians and responsible for torturing suspected criminals". This accusation did not go down well with the Indian government. The Indian External Affairs Ministry was asked by the Home minister to take up the issue with Canada. The Home ministry of India, as well as the Indian public in general and several of India's political parties, expressed outrage at this attack and called Canada's actions discriminatory and spurious, and their charges against the BSF as baseless and unproven. The Indian government threatened diplomatic retaliation unless Canada withdrew their allegations. The Canadian government did not respond immediately. It was speculated that diplomatic retaliation from India will consist of banning Canadians going to participate the War in Afghanistan if they are doing so through India. Public outrage in India prompted Canadian authorities to express "great respect for India's armed forces and related institutions". Subsequently, India's Ministry of External Affairs summoned Canadian High Commissioner Joseph Caron and demanded that "the blatant discrimination against Indian security agencies" cease. India's Minister of External Affairs, SM Krishna, condemned Canada's actions and has expressed pride in the accomplishments of the BSF.

Following complaints made by the Indian government and criticism of Canada's actions against India, the Harper government retracted their earlier accusations against BSF security officials. Canada's Minister of Citizenship and Immigration, Jason Kenney, termed as "unfortunate" the incidents involving use of "foul language by the Canadian High Commission in visa rejection letters to some individuals", Kenney said, "This language, or the inaccurate impression it has created, in no way reflects the policy or position of the Government of Canada."

Bangladesh border killings 
According to the Bangladeshi government, 136 civilians were killed and a further 170 others suffered injuries in 2009. The Indian government has said that 67 were killed and 80 injured in 2009. The Bangladesh government and Bangladeshi organizations protested heavily against these alleged killings. Media reports claim that in August 2008, Indian BSF officials admitted that they killed 59 persons (34 Bangladeshis, 21 Indians, rest unidentified) who were trying to cross the border illegally during the prior six months. Indian media claimed that, in 2001, Bangladesh Rifles ambushed and killed 16 BSF soldiers while they were chasing some Bangladeshi smugglers back into the Bangladesh. Since then, the BSF has been compelled to act tough against Bangladeshi illegals. There was perceived retaliation by the BSF but was averted after Home Ministers of both countries had talks on the issue.

In July 2009 Channel 4 News reported that apparently "hundreds" of Bangladeshis and Indians are indiscriminately killed by the BSF along the Indo-Bangladeshi Barrier. The BSF claims that the barrier's main purpose is to check illegal immigration to India, and prevent cross-border terrorism from Islamists.

Bangladeshi media accused the BSF of abducting 5 Bangladeshi children, aged between 8 and 15, from the Haripur Upazila in Thakurgaon District of Bangladesh, in 2010. The children were setting fishing nets near the border.

In 2010, Human Rights Watch (HRW) issued an 81-page report which alleged "over 900 of abuses by the BSF" in the first decade of the 21st century. The report was compiled from interviews with victims of BSF shootings, witnesses and members of the BSF and its Bangladeshi counterpart. According to HRW, while most of them were killed when they crossed into Indian territory for indulging in cattle raiding or other smuggling activities.

In February 2012, the BSF website was hacked by Bangladeshi hackers in retaliation. The hackers later shared the news in the internet and also in the other social sites where they claimed to have defaced the sites asking the BSF to stop killing Bangladeshis at border. The site became normal sometime on 15 February 2012.

Challenges

Working conditions 
Working conditions of the BSF have been questioned. "Zero Error Syndrome" adds stress. A home ministry standing committee report on the "Working Conditions in Border Guarding Forces" was published in December 2018, it was chaired by P. Chidambaram.

Health 
Health of employees remains a challenge, and given the numbers of the force, more employees, as compared to operational deaths, die of diseases, illness; and mental health issues have also been raised and addressed by the force.

In Media 

 BSF has appeared in National Geographic channel's documentry BSF : The first line of defence.

See also 
 Assam Rifles
 Border Security Force (Water Wing)
 Central Industrial Security Force
 Central Reserve Police Force
 Indo-Tibetan Border Police
 Sashastra Seema Bal

References

External links 

 
 Border Security Force @ India Defence
 Global Security
 CI Operations in Jammu and Kashmir
 Tear Smoke Unit

1965 establishments in India
Border guarding forces of India
Central Armed Police Forces of India
Federal law enforcement agencies of India
Military units and formations established in 1965